The Reverend Adrian Victor Benjamin (born 1942) is a prebendary emeritus of St Paul's Cathedral (appointed in October 2007) and a former actor who has appeared with Richard Burton and Elizabeth Taylor.

He is a graduate of Wadham College, Oxford (BA, 1966; MA, 1968).  He was vicar of All Saints' Church, Friern Barnet from 1975 until 2012, and the religious editor for the ITV Oracle service since 1983.

He played the Pope in the film Dr Faustus (1967). He was a contestant on The Search.

References 

1942 births
Male actors from London
Living people
Alumni of Wadham College, Oxford
20th-century Church of England clergy
English male actors
People educated at Queen Elizabeth's Grammar School, Alford
20th-century English male actors